Kerrie-Ann Craddock (born 30 August 1984) is a female rugby union player for . She was a member of the Irish squad to the 2014 Women's Rugby World Cup in France. She made her international debut at the 2014 Women's Six Nations Championship in 's opening match against . She is a Geography teacher. She is now the head of post 16 at Exmouth community college.

References

External links
Irish Rugby Profile
Saracens Profile

1984 births
Living people
Irish female rugby union players
Ireland women's international rugby union players
Irish expatriate sportspeople in England
Irish Exiles women's rugby union players